Andrea Stella may refer to:
Andrea Stella (composer) (fl. 1620s), Italian priest and composer.
Andrea Stella (engineer) (born 1971), Italian engineer currently working in Formula One